The 55th Combat Training Squadron (55 CTS) is a United States Space Force unit assigned to Space Operations Command's Space Delta 5. Formerly the 614 CTS, the squadron was activated on 16 December 2016 to implement and sustain enterprise-wide changes under the Space Training Transformation and Space Mission Force constructs. It is headquartered at Vandenberg Space Force Base, California.

List of commanders 
 Lt Col Nicole M. Petrucci, 16 December 2016 – May 2019
 Lt Col Krista N. St. Romain, May 2019 – 16 June 2021
 Lt Col Forrest Poole, 16 June 2021 – present

See also 
 Space Delta 5

References

External links 
 

Military education and training in the United States
Squadrons of the United States Space Force